The 2019 Torridge Council election took place on 2 May 2019 to elect members of Torridge District Council in England. This was on the same day as other local elections. The whole council was up for election on new boundaries.

Summary

Election result

|-

Ward Results
Incumbents are denoted by an asterisk (*)

Appledore

Bideford East

Bideford North

Bideford South

Bideford West

Broadheath

Great Torrington

Hartland

Holsworthy

Milton & Tamarside

Monkleigh & Putford

Northam

Shebbear & Langtree

Two Rivers & Three Moors

Westward Ho!

Winkleigh

By-elections

Northam

References 

2019
2019 English local elections
2010s in Devon
May 2019 events in the United Kingdom